Silivrispor  is a Turkish sports club from Silivri, in the north-west of Turkey.

The clubs plays in red and blue kits, and have done so since their formation in 1957.

In 2013–2014 season, Silivrispor participate in TFF Third League.

Stadium
Currently the team plays at the 3,000 capacity Silivri Stadium.

League participations
TFF First League: 1986–87
TFF Second League: 2017–18
TFF Third League: 1984–86, 1987–94, 2012–17, 2018–
Turkish Regional Amateur League: 2011–12
Turkish Amateur Football Leagues: 1957–84, 1994–2011

References

External links
Silivrispor on TFF.org

Football clubs in Turkey
1957 establishments in Turkey
Association football clubs established in 1957